The Book That Wrote Itself is a 1999 road movie written and directed by Liam O Mochain and starring Liam O Mochain, Antoinette Guiney. It also features cameo appearances from George Clooney, Kenneth Branagh, Melanie Griffith, Bryan Singer, and Chazz Palminteri, among others. The film screened at numerous film festivals worldwide and was released in 2000.

References

External links

 https://web.archive.org/web/20110614045644/http://www.wcthemovie.com/thebookthatwroteitself.com/index.html
 http://www.timeout.com/film/reviews/68261/the-book-that-wrote-itself.html
 https://web.archive.org/web/20100205083534/http://newenglandfilm.com/news/archives/01may/book.htm

1999 films
1999 comedy films
English-language Irish films
2000s English-language films
1990s English-language films